(born December 1964 in Tokyo, Japan) is a Japanese wingsuit pilot and skydiver who in 2012 held the world records for "Greatest horizontal distance flown in a wingsuit"  26.9 km (16.71 miles),
"Greatest absolute distance flown in a wingsuit"  28.707 km (17.83 miles) above California, USA on 26 May 2012,

He was a member of a US National Wingsuit flying formation record by 68 pilots in 2009.

Ito is CEO of Risk Control Corp, in Japan.

Bibliography
 , Bestsellers, August 2001,

References

External links
  
 Official blog 
 Shin Ito's profile at Birdman

1964 births
Living people
People from Tokyo
Skydivers